Bruno Ferraz das Neves, or simply Bruno (born June 11, 1984 in Porto Alegre), is a Brazilian football attacking midfielder.

Career

Grêmio
Bruno Ferraz previously played for Grêmio in the Campeonato Brasileiro.

References

External links

1984 births
Living people
Sportspeople from Rio Grande do Sul
Brazilian footballers
Brazilian expatriate footballers
Expatriate footballers in Portugal
Expatriate footballers in Japan
J2 League players
Grêmio Foot-Ball Porto Alegrense players
Fluminense FC players
Porto Alegre Futebol Clube players
Hokkaido Consadole Sapporo players
Guarani FC players
Mogi Mirim Esporte Clube players
Association football midfielders